Miniature painting may refer to:

 Miniature (illuminated manuscript), a small illustration used to decorate an illuminated manuscript
 Persian miniature, a small painting on paper in the Persian tradition, for a book or album
 Ottoman miniature, a small painting on paper in the tradition of the Ottoman Empire, for a book or album
 Mughal painting
 Deccan painting
 Portrait miniature, a miniature portrait painting
 Miniature figure (gaming), used in wargaming or role-playing games
 Miniature figure painting, the hobby of painting miniature figures